In addition to their first team competing in the Scottish Premiership, Aberdeen F.C. also maintain further teams for younger age groups playing in competitions such as the Scottish Challenge Cup and the Scottish Youth Cup within the club's academy.

Competitions

Reserves
In the early 1950s, reserve teams were incorporated into the third tier of the senior Scottish Football League, with Aberdeen 'A' taking part for six seasons of the arrangement. Aberdeen fielded a team for many years in various separate reserve competitions culminating in the Scottish Premier Reserve League, which was abandoned in 2009.

In July 2018, it was reported that reserve leagues would be reintroduced in lieu of the development leagues that had been in place since 2009 (below). The top tier of the new SPFL Reserve League featured 18 clubs, whilst a second-tier reserve League comprised nine clubs. Other than a minimum age of 16, no age restrictions applied to the leagues. Aberdeen intimated at the end of its first season (2018–19) that they would withdraw from the Reserve League to play a variety of challenge matches, several others did likewise.  They later entered a small league (under-21 plus three overage) along with three other Scottish clubs and Brentford and Huddersfield Town from the English leagues.

Youths
Prior to the introduction of the Scottish Premier League in 1998, the Under-20s previously competed in the youth league administered by the Scottish Football League. An under-20 side then took part in the SPFL Development League until it was disbanded in 2018. They won the last edition of the SFL competition and the first under the SPL, but they only won it once more (in 2014–15).

From 2015 onwards it has been possible for the Aberdeen Academy to participate in the UEFA Youth League by the under-17/under-18 side winning the previous season's league at that age group; however this has not yet been achieved.

For the 2016-17 edition of the Scottish Challenge Cup, under-20 teams (later under-21) of clubs in the Premiership were granted entry to compete against adult teams for the first time in the modern era. Aberdeen U20 won their opening round against Formartine United of the Highland League but lost in the next round to Forfar Athletic of the fourth tier.

Facilities
As of 2019, the reserves do not have a constant home ground. Their fixtures are normally played at lower league stadia outwith Aberdeen, either at Glebe Park in Brechin, Balmoor Stadium in Peterhead or Station Park in Forfar – although occasionally matches are played at Pittodrie Stadium. In the  
2018–19 season, their nominated ground was the recently completed Balmoral Stadium, home of Cove Rangers.

In the event that the long-awaited New Aberdeen Stadium is completed, the youth training facilities would certainly move to that location and some of the Reserve League fixtures may also take place there.

Academy background
Aberdeen's geographical isolation from much of Scotland's population is an advantage to the Dons' player recruitment to some extent, as they are the only major club in a region of over 500,000 people so generally have the pick of the promising youngsters in the city and shire. The relative economic power of the club also means that players from the Central Belt are frequently persuaded to move north, and over the decades many of Aberdeen's successful youth products (not least Willie Miller, McLeish, Black, Leighton, McMaster and later Joe Miller, Phil McGuire, Diamond and Chris Maguire) have moved from the west of Scotland to begin their professional careers. In the 21st century Aberdeen have also looked further afield to the English lower leagues for academy recruits as well as senior players.

In 2017, the Aberdeen academy was one of eight across the country designated 'elite' status on the introduction of Project Brave, an SFA initiative to concentrate the development of the best young players at a smaller number of clubs with high quality facilities and coaching than was previously the case.

The Reserves head coach is Paul Sheerin, and the head of the youth academy is Neil Simpson.

Squad

Reserves/Youths

Honours
Reserves 
SFL Division C (North-East)
Winners: 1952–53, 1954–55
Runners-up: 1950–51, 1953–54
Scottish Reserve League
Winners (4): 1955–56, 1972–73, 1981–82, 1986–87
Scottish Football Alliance
Winners: 1932–33, 1935–36
Scottish Reserve League Cup
Winners (9): 1950–51, 1951–52, 1956–57, 1957–58, 1972–73, 1973–74, 1978–79, 1984–85, 1996–97
Scottish 2nd XI Cup
Winners (6): 1954–55, 1955–56, 1968–69, 1975–76, 1977–78, 1981–82

Youth
Scottish Youth Cup
Winners (3): 1985, 1986, 2001
Runners-up: 2003, 2018
SPFL Development League
Winners: 1998–99, 2014–15
Runners-up: 1994–95, 2012–13
SFL Youth League
Winners: 1993–94, 1997–98

Notes

Former reserve/youth team players

This list focuses on the players who have graduated through Aberdeen's academy since the inception of the SPL in 1998. many other of Aberdeen's earlier notable players, including most of the highly successful Alex Ferguson era also came through the youth system.
Players currently at Aberdeen in bold 

Russell Anderson
Ryan Esson
Fergus Tiernan
Michael Hart
Darren Mackie
Russell Duncan
Phil McGuire
Chris Clark
Kevin McNaughton
Kevin Rutkiewicz
Ricky Foster
Scott Morrison
Zander Diamond
Andrew Considine
Chris Maguire
Michael Paton
Nicky Clark
Peter Pawlett
Ryan Jack

Nicky Low
Stephen O'Donnell
Mitchel Megginson
Fraser Fyvie
Jack Grimmer
Scott Bain
Ryan Fraser
Joe Shaughnessy
Clark Robertson
Declan McManus
Lawrence Shankland
Cammy Smith
Scott Wright
Scott McKenna
Frank Ross
Dean Campbell
Bruce Anderson
Connor McLennan

Footnotes

References

External links 
 Under-20s at Aberdeen official website
 Academy overview at Aberdeen official website
 Squad including Under-20s at Aberdeen FC Heritage Trust
Aberdeen U20 at Soccerway

Aberdeen F.C.
Scottish reserve football teams
Youth football in Scotland
Football academies in Scotland